Lloyd Langlois (born November 11, 1962) is a Canadian freestyle skier and Olympic medalist. He received a bronze medal at the 1994 Winter Olympics in Lillehammer, in aerials.

He finished 3rd in the aerials (demonstration event) at the 1988 Winter Olympics in Calgary.

Langlois has been inducted into the Canadian Olympic Hall of Fame.

References

External links

1962 births
Living people
Canadian male freestyle skiers
Freestyle skiers at the 1994 Winter Olympics
Olympic bronze medalists for Canada
Olympic medalists in freestyle skiing
Medalists at the 1994 Winter Olympics